Xenia Georgiou (born 24 October 1988) is a Cypriot footballer who plays as a centre back for First Division club Lefkothea Latsion. She has been a member of the Cyprus women's national team.

Club career
Georgiou started playing in 2004. Her first club was AEK Kokkinochorion. In 2009, she joined Lefkothea Latsion. On 25 September 2016, she moved to AC Omonia. One year later, she rejoined Lefkothea Latsion.

International career
Georgiou capped for Cyprus at senior level during the 2017 Aphrodite Cup, including a 1–2 loss to Latvia on 12 March 2017.

References

1988 births
Living people
Women's association football central defenders
Cypriot women's footballers
Cyprus women's international footballers
AC Omonia players